Adaora Lily Ulasi  (born 1932) was a Nigerian journalist and novelist. She is said to have been the first West African woman to earn a degree in journalism. As a journalist, she has worked for the BBC and Voice of America. As a novelist she wrote detective fiction in English, "adapting the genre of the crime thriller to an Igbo or Yoruba context".

Biography
Born in Aba, Eastern Nigeria, daughter of an Igbo Chief, she attended the local missionary school, but at the age of 15 was sent to the U.S. to study. After graduating from high school she then studied at Pepperdine University and at the University of Southern California, earning a BA in journalism in 1954. She supplemented her income by writing the occasional newspaper column, working as a nanny, and as a film extra appearing, for example, in the 1953 film White Witch Doctor that starred Susan Hayward and Robert Mitchum. 

In the 1960s she was women's page editor of the Daily Times of Nigeria. She subsequently married Deryk James and had three children Heather, Angela and Martin. After her divorce in 1972 she went to Nigeria as editor of Woman's World magazine, and in 1976 returned to England. 

Her first novel, Many Thing You No Understand (1970), "controversially (for the first time) used pidgin English to dramatise the interaction between colonial officers and local people in the pre-independence era, as did her subsequent works, Many Thing Begin For Change (1971), Who Is Jonah? (1978) and The Man from Sagamu (1978). By contrast, The Night Harry Died (1974) is set in southern USA." Ulasi worked at the Times Complex in Lagos, Nigeria.

Bibliography

Many Thing You No Understand – London: Michael Joseph, 1970; Fontana, 1973
Many Thing Begin For Change – London: Michael Joseph, 1971; Fontana, 1975
The Night Harry Died – Lagos: Research Institute Nigeria, 1974
Who Is Jonah? – Ibadan: Onibonoje Press, 1978
The Man From Sagamu – London: Collins/Fontana, 1978; New York: Collier Macmillan, 1978

See also
 List of Nigerian women writers

References

External links 
 "56 Years of Nigerian Literature: Adaora Lily Ulasi", Bookshy, October 2016.

1932 births
Living people
Nigerian women novelists
Pepperdine University alumni
USC Annenberg School for Communication and Journalism alumni
20th-century Nigerian novelists
20th-century Nigerian women writers
Nigerian editors
People from Aba, Abia
BBC people
Voice of America people
Women's page journalists
Igbo people